Nikki Haley, a former governor of South Carolina and U.S. ambassador to the United Nations, announced her campaign for the 2024 United States presidential election in a campaign video on February 14, 2023. Haley is the first woman of color to be a major candidate for the Republican presidential nomination. She is the first female governor to run for president.

If elected, Haley would become the first female president of the United States and would be the first Asian American president.

Background

Early speculation for national office
Haley was first elected governor of South Carolina in the 2010 election and reelected in the 2014 election. She gained a national profile during her tenure, which led to speculation that she would be a potential vice presidential candidate in 2012 and 2016.

In January 2016, the House Republican Conference announced that Haley would give the English Republican Response to the State of the Union address, furthering the vice-presidential rumors.

Then President-Elect Donald Trump nominated Haley to the position of U.N. Ambassador on November 23, 2016. During her tenure as U.N. ambassador, there was speculation that she was using the position to gain foreign policy experience in preparation for a future presidential candidacy. This speculation was motivated by the open policy disagreements Haley and the Trump administration experienced.

Pre-candidacy developments
In 2019, Haley created a new policy group named Stand for America, a group that promotes public policies aimed at strengthening the economy, culture, and national security. Haley hired influential political strategist Tim Chapman as the group's executive director, which some believed indicated she was gearing up for a presidential campaign. Several billionaires and hedge fund managers have made large donations to the group.

In February 2021, Haley created a PAC to endorse and support candidates in the 2022 midterm elections. She hired former NRSC political director Betsy Ankney to be executive director. She campaigned for Republican candidates in Georgia, Pennsylvania, New Hampshire, and Wisconsin in the lead up to election day. This move was seen as an effort to lay the stages of a '24 campaign and boost her national image. 

While speaking at Christians United for Israel's Washington summit in July 2022, Haley hinted at a run for president in the 2024 U.S. presidential election, saying, "If this president signs any sort of [Iran nuclear] deal, I'll make you a promise: The next president will shred it on her first day in office," and, "Just saying, sometimes it takes a woman."

On January 31, 2023, it was reported that Haley would announce a bid for the presidency on February 15, making her the first challenger to former President Donald Trump's campaign. Haley will be the third Indian-American politician to seek a presidential nomination following Bobby Jindal and current Vice President Kamala Harris. Haley had previously claimed that she would not run for the candidacy if Trump also sought the nomination.

Campaign

Announcement and launch 
On February 14, 2023, Haley released a video announcing her intent to run as a candidate for the Republican nomination for president. Filmed in her hometown of Bamberg, South Carolina, Haley spoke of her Indian heritage, race relations, global human rights violations, her tenure as governor and Ambassador, and the threats facing the United States before announcing her run.

On February 15, 2023, Haley officially launched her candidacy during a campaign event in Charleston, South Carolina. John Hagee gave the invocation. Other notable speakers were Cindy Warmbier (the mother of Otto Warmbier), Rep. Ralph Norman (R-Sc), and Katon Dawson (former South Carolina Republican Party chairman). Norman's early support of Haley was considered significant in light of his history of supporting Trump and Norman's efforts to overturn the 2020 election. At the event, Haley also praised Hagee, saying she still wanted to be him when she grew up. Hagee is known for his history of making controversial statements, which led 2008 Republican nominee John McCain to reject his endorsement during McCain's own presidential campaign.

Her launch event featured "Eye of the Tiger", prompting the song's co-author, Frankie Sullivan, to criticize Haley for the unauthorized use of his song.

As South Carolina's former governor, commentators have suggested that the early date of the 2024 South Carolina Republican primary may play to Haley's advantage in the primary.

Post-announcement 
Haley hosted speaking events in Iowa and New Hampshire during her first week as a candidate. Her first post-launch event was held the day after her Charleston event on February 16 in Exeter, New Hampshire. She was introduced by former Republican Senate candidate, Gen. Don Bolduc (R-NH). Bolduc endorsed Haley on Twitter the same day.

In March 2023, Haley spoke at two major competing conservative conferences: the Conservative Political Action Conference (CPAC) and a private donor event held by the Club for Growth. Haley is one of two Republican active or potential candidates to attend both, while most other candidates (both announced and speculated) have chosen one event or the other. Trump only appeared at CPAC after not being invited by the Club. Ron DeSantis, Florida's governor and suspected presidential candidate, declined to attend CPAC in favor of the Club's event. This split in attendance among high-profile Republican officials makes Haley's double appearance notable. It has been considered a display of Haley's effort to appeal to the two major factions of the Republican party.

Political positions during presidential campaign

Overview 
In her video announcement, Haley summarized the mission of her candidacy as "fiscal responsibility, secur[ing] our border, and strengthen[ing] our country, our pride, and our purpose."

The campaign's website maintains a list of Haley's actions while in prior offices, highlighting the policies she would likely pursue if elected. These actions range from her time as South Carolina Governor and her time as the United Nations Ambassador. The list focuses on economic and foreign policy issues, with abortion, guns, and immigration also receiving coverage.

In an article following her announcement, The New York Times described Haley as a "darling of neoconservatives and a defender of Reagan's continued relevance".

Abortion 
Haley has called for "consensus" on national abortion policy, and indicated she would oppose a full ban on abortion. In a 2023 interview, she pointed to a proposal from Senator Lindsey Graham that would establish a national 15-week abortion ban, with exceptions for rape, incest, health, and life of the mother.

Foreign policy 
After Haley's announcement, the Council on Foreign Relations called her foreign policy one of a "traditional, tough-minded Republican approach to foreign policy."

Haley has stated that the United States must remain the global superpower. To that end, she pledged to combat the influence of China and Russia on the international stage.

China 
Haley has taken a strong stance against alleged Chinese influence in domestic and international affairs, calling China the top threat to the United States.

She called the Biden administration's response to the 2023 Chinese balloon incident "a national embarrassment."

Foreign aid 
In an opinion article published in the New York Post on February 24, 2023, Haley vowed to "cut every cent in foreign aid for countries that hate [the United States]". She listed Iraq, Pakistan, Zimbabwe, China, and Cuba as such countries, and labeled them enemies of the United States.

Russo-Ukrainian War 
Haley has pledged her support for the American military aid to Ukraine in its war against Russia. She has said that opposing Russia in Ukraine is a vital interest for the United States. She it is necessary to prevent further invasions by Russia or China into other nations that would spark a world war. In a February 2023 interview and during campaign stops in Iowa and New Hampshire Haley said, "The war in Ukraine and Russia is not about Ukraine; it’s about freedom — and it’s a war we have to win.” She suggested the United States should supply Ukraine military equipment rather than money.  

Haley criticized the Biden administration for "emboldening" Putin's desire to invade Ukraine during the American withdrawal from Afghanistan.

Elections & government

Candidate competency 
One of her first proposals as a candidate was to call for candidates over the age of 75—which would include both Trump and Biden—to be required to take a competency test. This led CNN personality Don Lemon to say that Haley "isn't in her prime" and that a woman is "considered to be in her prime in her 20s and 30s and maybe 40s". The comments went viral and received widespread negative reactions, with many, including Haley herself, labeling his comments sexist. Lemon later apologized for the comments.

Term limits 
In her campaign announcement speech, Haley called for congressional term limits without specifying the details of these limits.

Social Issues

LGBTQ+ issues 
In February 2023, Haley said that the Florida Parental Rights in Education Act, commonly referred to as the "Don't Say Gay" law, doesn't go far enough. She proposed extending the Act's prohibitions against discussing sex and sexuality before third grade until seventh grade. She also suggested that such discussions should require opt-in parental consent.

Endorsements

Polling 

At the launch of her campaign, most reputable polls reported Haley receiving approximately 4-7% of the Republican vote. She experienced a boost in support after her campaign launch.

References 

2023 establishments in the United States
2024 Republican Party (United States) presidential campaigns
Nikki Haley